A summons is a legal document issued by a court.

The Summons may also refer to:
The Summons (Mason novel), a 1920 novel by A. E. W. Mason
The Summons (Grisham novel), a 2002 novel by John Grisham
"The Summons" (hymn), a Christian hymn

People with the surname
Arthur Summons (born 1935), Australian representative rugby union and rugby league player

See also
Summon or evocation, the act of conjuring supernatural creatures
Summoner (disambiguation)
Summoning (disambiguation)